The men's 75 kilograms event at the 2006 Asian Games was held on December 8, 2006 at the Al-Dana Banquet Hall in Doha, Qatar.

Schedule
All times are Arabia Standard Time (UTC+03:00)

Results

Prejudging round 

 Faez Abdul-Hassan of Iraq originally got the 7th place, but was disqualified after a banned steroid was found in his luggage in Doha International Airport.

Final round

References

Results – Prejudging Round
Results – Final Round

Bodybuilding at the 2006 Asian Games